Myanmar competed at the 1992 Summer Paralympics in Barcelona, Spain. 1 competitors from Myanmar won no medals and so did not place in the medal table.

See also 
 Myanmar at the Paralympics
 Myanmar at the 1992 Summer Olympics

References 

Myanmar at the Paralympics
Nations at the 1992 Summer Paralympics